stylized as INFINITI, is the luxury vehicle division of the Japanese automaker Nissan. Infiniti officially started selling vehicles on November 8, 1989, in North America. The marketing network for Infiniti-branded vehicles included dealers in over 50 countries in the 2010s. As of 2020, there were 25 markets served by new car dealers. The main markets are North America, China, and Middle East.

According to the company, the Infiniti badge has a double meaning, as stylized representations of both a road extending into the horizon and of Mount Fuji, reflecting its Japanese origins.

History

The beginning

The Infiniti brand was introduced in the United States in 1989 to target the premium vehicle segments in the United States that would not have otherwise fit in with Nissan's more mainstream image, and partially influenced by the Plaza Accord of 1985. The brand was created around the same time that Japanese rivals Toyota and Honda developed their Lexus and Acura premium brands, respectively. The Japanese government imposed voluntary export restraints for the U.S. market, so it was more profitable for automakers to export more expensive cars to the U.S.

The Infiniti marque was launched with two models, the Q45, and the M30 that were previously sold at Japanese Nissan Motor Store dealership networks. The Q45 was based on the all new second generation JDM Nissan President on a five millimeter shorter wheelbase platform at 2,875 mm (113.2 in). Starting with model year 1992, the wheelbase matched the President's wheelbase at 2880 mm (113.4 in). The Q45 included a  V8 engine, four wheel steering, and active suspension system offered on the first generation Q45t. The car's features would have made it competitive in the full-sized "luxury" segment against the Mercedes S-Class, BMW 7 Series, Jaguar XJ and Cadillac Fleetwood.

A second model was introduced in November 1989, the two-door M30, a badge engineered Nissan Leopard. It remained in production for three years as an alternative to the Lexus SC. The powertrain was the VG30E  engine and an automatic transmission. The M30 convertible weighed even more, due to the required body and chassis reinforcements. The appearance of the M30 had almost no resemblance to the larger Q45, and the interior was almost completely different.

Infiniti did not offer a mid-luxury sedan to match the first Japanese luxury sedan introduced to North America, the Acura Legend, which was later joined by the Lexus GS. Infiniti's first offering in the entry-level luxury segment was the Infiniti J30, which had to compete with the revised 1992 Lexus ES and was unsuccessful owing to its small interior and unusual styling to which it was succeeded in 1996 by the Infiniti I series introduced previously in April 1995, related to the Nissan Maxima and in 2002 by the Infiniti G35.

1990s

In September 1990, Infiniti introduced a third model, the Infiniti G20, derived from the compact and European-focused Nissan Primera.

In 1992 for the 1993 model year, Infiniti introduced a four-door coupé J30 with only one engine option, the  VG30DE. This engine was from the  300ZX, the JDM Nissan Cedric, Nissan Gloria and the Nissan Cima, and was the North American version of the third generation JDM Nissan Leopard.

Infiniti sales were slow. The company's initial campaign aimed to bring about brand awareness with Zen-influenced spots that focused on nature and tranquility, without showing the actual cars. Designers decided not to adorn the interiors with wood accents and chrome brightwork, opting instead for a monochrome, organic and rounded surface appearance, focusing on padded leather and vinyl throughout. Some buyers had faux wood appliques added to areas surrounding the center console and around the interior door handles. The only item that had a bright appearance was the centrally installed analog clock in all models, a design that is currently maintained by the designers.

By the mid-1990s, Infiniti was lagging behind Lexus and Acura in sales. The Q45 had retreated considerably from its focused, taut rendition of a sporty full-size luxury sedan, having become a barely recognizable, ponderously handling sedan that earned the nickname "The Japanese Lincoln". In the summer of 1998, Infiniti revived the G20, based on the JDM Nissan Primera, a compact sport sedan. The second generation G20 was marketed as a competitor to European entry-level luxury sport sedans, but it now weighed more than the first generation version. Because Infiniti continued to use the SR20DE four-cylinder engine and compact size, it fell short of sales expectations. The G20 was also marketed primarily to the wrong demographic, that being middle-aged professional women, and as such it was not as popular new as its main competition, the similarly priced Acura Integra.

In late 1996, Infiniti released the QX4, modifying and adding premium accommodations to the Nissan Pathfinder, becoming one of the first luxury car manufacturers to offer a mid-size premium SUV.

Infiniti replaced the J30 mid-sized rear drive sedan with the second-generation JDM Nissan Cefiro, giving it the North American designation "I30" in 1996.  It offered one engine, the  VQ30DE with front wheel drive shared with the Maxima. The I30 was redesigned for the 2000 model year, featuring an increase in power to 231 PS (170 kW; 227 hp). Infiniti made further changes to the I30's appearance and performance in mid-2001, upgrading the engine to the more powerful 259 PS (190 kW; 255 hp) VQ35DE; this inspired a name change to the vehicle, which became the I35. Sales and the brand, bereft of an image or a following, floundered.

2000s

By 2000, large Japanese companies were feeling the effect of the Japanese asset price bubble, and the reduced desirability of Infiniti's led to its facing extinction. The company rededicated itself to developing a dynamic and powerful line-up of sporty luxury cars. This coincided with parent company Nissan entering into an alliance with Renault under the direction of Carlos Ghosn and the Nissan Revival Plan. Car and Driver reported that Infiniti executives invited members of the motoring press to a meeting where they "swore never again to take their eyes off BMW." Although this effort began with a completely redesigned Q45 flagship for the 2002 model year in early 2001, it was the G35 that helped improve Infiniti sales by 2003. In Japan, Nissan had a well established reputation with premium level performance sedans after Nissan acquired the Prince Motor Company and integrated the Nissan Skyline, Nissan Laurel and Nissan Gloria, originally Prince vehicles, in 1966–1968. A sports sedan replacing its Nissan Primera-based predecessor (the G20), the Nissan Skyline-based Infiniti G35, was successful after it was voted Motor Trend Car of the Year in 2003.

The release of the sport-tuned FX35/45 crossover that same year piggybacked on the G35's success. The FX used the same components as the G35 sport coupe and was designed for American tastes. It combined good handling and performance with station wagon-like versatility and all-weather capability. In 2004, Infiniti added an all-wheel drive version of the G35 sports sedan to compete with similar all-wheel drive sports sedans from Audi and BMW. Infiniti also introduced a larger SUV to compete with the Toyota Land Cruiser/Lexus LX470. This was the 2004 Infiniti QX56 based on the U.S. market Nissan Armada.

Nissan Motors President and CEO, Carlos Ghosn, developed a business strategy to break Infiniti away from its Nissan roots. The G series helped re-define Infiniti as the "Japanese BMW", as it was aimed directly at the BMW 3 Series of sedans and coupes. The M35/M45 garnered acclaim from the automotive press, winning an eight-car comparison test in Car and Driver, and the model was named the best luxury sedan by Consumer Reports. The M45 model featured the same engine as the Q45, and the M45 became the flagship model after the Q45 was discontinued. The Infiniti M (2002–2005) and the Infiniti G (starting in 2002) were known in Japan as the Nissan Gloria and the Nissan Skyline.

In November 2006 for the 2007 model year a redesigned version of the G35 sedan was launched, followed in August 2007 by a new version of the company's G coupe, the G37. The coupe was first unveiled at the New York International Auto Show in April 2007. Also released in (December) 2007 was new Infiniti EX35 compact crossover, Infiniti's entry into the compact luxury crossover market. The EX shared the G35's 3.5-liter, V6 engine.

Carlos Ghosn unveiled Infiniti's arrival in Europe at the 2008 Geneva Motor Show. The official launch was late 2008, and was phased over a two-year period across 21 European countries. Four models are offered in Europe: the next generation of the Infiniti FX37 and Infiniti FX50 performance SUV, the Infiniti G37, the Infiniti G37 coupe, and the Infiniti EX37 crossover. Infiniti Europe's headquarters are in Rolle, Switzerland.

2010s

Carlos Ghosn unveiled the Infiniti M at a hotel in Los Angeles. It shares the VQ37VHR from the Infiniti G, and Nissan 370Z. Featured are new powertrains: the 5.6 L V8 (VK56VD) with VVEL, Gasoline direct injection, the Nissan-Renault V9X Engine V6 Turbo Diesel (only for Europe), and the newly developed hybrid that includes one electric motor and two clutches to allow the gas engine and electric motor to drive the rear wheels simultaneously. The lithium-ion battery pack was first displayed in the Essence concept car.

At the 2010 Geneva Motor Show, Infiniti launched a new powertrain for Europe, with the new V9X Engine developed by the Renault-Nissan Alliance. The new engine is used in the Infiniti FX, Infiniti EX, and the new Infiniti M. The new Infiniti M made its European debut at the show.

In August 2010 Infiniti unveiled its new performance division named Infiniti Performance Line, or IPL. Soon thereafter in 2011, Infiniti chose to sponsor the Renault engines for Red Bull Racing for the 2011 Formula One season.

As of 2011, the G Series (consisting of the sedan, coupe, and convertible) accounts for 60% of sales. This has been attributed to their SUVs (including crossovers) which have been seen as determinedly aimed at the narrowest of niches, a lost opportunity as SUVs are popular in the U.S. market. In contrast, at archrival Lexus, SUVs contributed half of the sales volume. In 2011, Infiniti sales fell, while other import luxury vehicles were doing well. Furthermore, Infiniti's performance over practicality emphasis has resulted in its crossovers and SUVs faring poorly among women compared to offerings from Acura and Lexus.

Nissan announced the return of front-wheel drive to the Infiniti lineup on August 30, 2011, with the release of the Infiniti JX. It joins Toyota's Lexus brand in terms of blending front-wheel drive and rear-wheel drive vehicles again; since its inception in 1989, Lexus has had front-wheel drive platforms underpinning entry-level vehicles like the Lexus ES and Lexus RX. More importantly, the JX was meant to give Infiniti a credible rival to the Acura MDX and BMW X5 crossovers that offer optional three-row seating.

In 2012, Infiniti moved its global headquarters from the Nissan corporate building in Yokohama and incorporated in Hong Kong as Infiniti Global Limited, with Carlos Ghosn intending for Infiniti to have a greater focus on the burgeoning luxury market in mainland China as it forecast the country to become the largest luxury car market.  Nissan appointed Roland Krüger, former head of BMW's Asian division, as president of Infiniti in September 2014.

In mid-2013 Infiniti announced their Q30 Concept car would get its world premiere at the 2013 Frankfurt Motor Show, a move which would see Infiniti start an aggressive strategy to extend the Infiniti brand into new premium segments. In 2013, Infiniti's model designation changed to the coupes and sedans starting with the letter Q (SUVs and crossovers starting with the letters QX) and a number reflecting the model's place in the brand lineup. The M sedan became the Q70 while the G sedan was replaced with the Q50; meanwhile, the QX56 became the QX80 while the EX became the QX50.

In August 2013 Infiniti announced that Simone Piattelli Palmarini would take up the role as head of public relations for Infiniti EMEA. Known to many in the media, Simone had previously worked for Pirelli and Ferrari.

With its QX60 crossover (formerly known as JX35) Infiniti began to produce vehicles outside Japan. In 2014, it started producing two models in Xiangyang, China, a plant operated by Nissan's joint venture with Dongfeng Motor. At the same time, Nissan Motor Manufacturing UK expanded in Sunderland, England, to produce a new compact car named Q30 in 2015. In mid-2019, the Sunderland plant ceased assembly of Infiniti vehicles in the United Kingdom.

Johan de Nysschen was appointed to head the Infiniti division in 2012. De Nysschen left the company as of August 2014 to become CEO of Cadillac. Infiniti Chairman Andy Palmer assumed de Nysschen's responsibilities. Nissan appointed Roland Krüger, former head of BMW's Asian division, as president of Infiniti after the chairman of the marque, Andy Palmer, resigned to join Aston Martin in September 2014. 

In January 2018, chief executive Hiroto Saikawa announced that the Infiniti brand would be transformed into an electric brand, with all new vehicles either being hybrid or all-electric by 2021.

In 2019, Infiniti announced that the brand would be leaving the Western European market. This is due to a combination of poor sales and the uncertain Brexit outcome. Furthermore, Infiniti was lacking brand equity and remained a niche player in the premium car market dominated by the longtime three German luxury marques (Audi, BMW, Mercedes-Benz). Infiniti stated its intent to focus on the Chinese (excluding Hong Kong and Macau), Middle East, and North American markets instead, where most of the brand's sales come from. Subsequently, the QX30 and Q30 produced at the Nissan factory in Sunderland were to cease production. Similarly, on September 3, 2019, it was announced that Infiniti would leave Australia and New Zealand due to slow sales in the region.

Accordingly, Infiniti left the European (excluding Caucasus, Russia, Kazakhstan, and Ukraine), South Africa, Australia, New Zealand, Hong Kong, Macau, Malaysia, Singapore, South Korea, and Vietnam markets in 2020. In South Korea, sales of Nissan and Infiniti had dropped after "consumer sentiment against Japanese products intensified", leading to both marques being discontinued there. It also relocated its headquarters from Hong Kong to Yokohama, Japan, where parent company Nissan is located.

In November 2021, Nissan stated that its Infiniti brand will become 100 percent all-electric by 2030, ending production and new car sales of fossil fuel powered Infiniti vehicles by that year.

In March 2022, Nissan withdrew entirely from Russia as a result of the 2022 Russian invasion of Ukraine, effectively ending all production in Russia, exports into Russia, and new car sales of Nissan and Infiniti vehicles in the country as a result of sanctions imposed on Russia by the European Union, Japan, and the United States.

Sales by calendar year

Models

Infiniti's former model name designation included one letter for coupés and sedans, two letters for SUVs, and a number reflecting engine displacement. For example, the QX56 was an SUV featuring a 5.6L engine. An exception to this was the QX4 SUV, which featured a 3.3L engine (1996–2000) and later a 3.5L engine (2000–2003). An "x" following the engine displacement of Infiniti sedans denoted an all wheel drive model (e.g. Infiniti G35x), "s" denoted a sport package, "h" denoted a hybrid model, and "d" denoted a diesel model.

In 2013, Infiniti's model designation changed to the coupes and sedans starting with the letter Q, the SUVs and crossovers starting with the letters QX, and a number reflecting the model's place in the brand lineup. The M sedan became the Q70, the G coupe became the Q60, and the G sedan became the Q50; meanwhile, the QX56 became the QX80, the FX became the QX70, the JX became the QX60 and the EX became the QX50.

Concept vehicles

Infiniti FX45 Concept (2001, 2002)
Infiniti Triant (2003)
Infiniti Kuraza (2005)
Infiniti Coupe (2006)
Infiniti EX Concept (2007)
Infiniti Essence (2009)
Infiniti Etherea (2011)
Infiniti Emerg-e (2012)
Infiniti Q30 Concept (2013)
Infiniti Q50 Eau Rouge (2014)
Infiniti Q80 Inspiration (2014)
Infiniti QX Sport Inspiration (2016)
Infiniti Prototype 9 (2017)
Infiniti QX50 Concept (2017)
Infiniti QX80 Monograph (2017)
Infiniti Q60 Project Black S Concept (2017)
Infiniti Prototype 10 (2018)
Infiniti Q Inspiration (2018)
Infiniti QS Inspiration (2019)
Infiniti QX Inspiration (2019)

Infiniti Performance Line

In August 2010, Infiniti unveiled its new performance marque named Infiniti Performance Line, or IPL.

Motorsports
In 1996, Nissan launched an effort to compete in the Indy Racing League with the Infiniti brand. The engine chosen for the Indy cars was a racing variant of the VH engine used in the production Q45s. Eddie Cheever resulted third in the 2000 season. The IRL program was quietly wrapped after the 2002 season after a few wins.

In 2011, Infiniti began sponsoring Formula One team Red Bull Racing, which was chosen due to the team's already existing collaboration with the Renault-Nissan Alliance, with Renault supplying engines to Red Bull Racing. In 2011, Infiniti signed Formula One World Champion Sebastian Vettel as its first global ambassador. Infiniti ended its sponsorship of the team after the 2015 season.

The establishment of Renault F1 Team in 2016 by the Renault-Nissan-Mitsubishi alliance provided Infiniti with the opportunity to evolve its involvement in Formula One, collaborating on three main projects. Infiniti contributes engineering resources to Renault F1 Team for the co-development of the Power Unit's Energy Recovery System (ERS), including relocating several of their specialists to the Renault F1 Team's facilities in France. In addition, the Infiniti Engineering Academy provides for engineering students to collaborate with the Renault F1 Team. Infiniti and the Renault F1 team also collaborate on Project Black S, a road car that features an ERS inspired by the one used in Formula One.

In 2020, a few Infiniti Q50s were entered into the British Touring Car Championship by Laser Tools Racing. They won the drivers' championship with Ash Sutton at the wheel that year and the subsequent year.

References

External links
 
 

 
Car manufacturers of Japan
Luxury motor vehicle manufacturers
Vehicle manufacturing companies established in 1989
1989 establishments in Japan
Car manufacturers of Hong Kong
Car manufacturers of China
IndyCar Series engine manufacturers
Car brands
Car manufacturers
Companies established in 1989